A list of films produced in Argentina in 1931:

1931
Films
Argentine